Dagmar Salén (née Mörner, 22 May 1901 – 20 December 1980) was a Swedish sailor. Together with her husband Sven Salén  she won a bronze medal in the mixed 6 m class at the 1936 Summer Olympics, becoming the first Swedish woman to win an Olympic medal in sailing.

Salén was born in a noble family, and married Sven Salén in 1931. Their son Sven H. Salén (born 1939) became a lawyer and politician.

References 

1901 births
1980 deaths
Swedish female sailors (sport)
Olympic sailors of Sweden
Sailors at the 1936 Summer Olympics – 6 Metre
Olympic bronze medalists for Sweden
Olympic medalists in sailing

Medalists at the 1936 Summer Olympics
Sportspeople from Örebro